Rafael Levaković (also Raphael Levacovich) O.F.M. ( – 1649) was a Franciscan prelate who served as Archbishop of Achrida (1647–1650); and Glagolitic writer who set foundations for Slavic liturgy based on the missionary concept of the Roman Catholic Church. Levaković actively worked on religious conversion of the Orthodox Serbs in Croatia.

Biography
Raphael Levacovich was born in Jastrebarsko, Croatia in 1597 (some sources say 1607) and ordained a priest in the Order of Friars Minor.

Translation of the liturgical books 
In 17th century Roman Catholic Church followed reformist example of the Protestantism and decided to publish liturgical books on language understandable for most South Slavs. This task was given to Sacred Congregation for the Propagation of the Faith that engaged Levaković. Based on explicit instructions given directly by the Pope, Levaković's activities were supported by Metodije Terlecki. In 1628 Levaković published Nauk Krstjanski and in 1631 Misal. In 1640 Benedikt Vinković, a Catholic bishop of the Archdiocese of Zagreb, had intention to depose Maksim Predojević, Serb bishop of the Bishopric of Marča, and appoint Rafael Levaković instead.

Episcopate
On 27 May 1647, he was appointed during the papacy of Pope Innocent X as Archbishop of Achrida in Ohrid.
On 2 June 1647, he was consecrated bishop by Pier Luigi Carafa, Cardinal-Priest of Santi Silvestro e Martino ai Monti, with Ranuccio Scotti Douglas, Bishop of Borgo San Donnino, and Alessandro Vittrici, Bishop Emeritus of Alatri, serving as co-consecrators. 
He served as Archbishop of Achrida until his death in 1650.

Bibliography 
Works of Rafael Levaković include:
 Nauk karstjanski kratak (Glagolitic), (Rome, 1628)
 Azbukividnik (1629, 1693), (Glagolitic, Latin script and Cyrillic script)
 Missal rimskij va ezik slovenskij (Rome, 1631)
 Časoslov Rimski (1648)
 De Illyrica lingua 
 Dialogus de antiquorum Illyricorum lingua
 Historiola episcopatus ac dioecesis ecclesiae Zagrabiensis
 De ecclesiae Zagrabiensis fundatione
 De Spiritus Sancti processione
 Ordo et series cleri Dioecesis Zagrabiensis 8. Martii 1574. in synodo
 eleven letters to Zageb bishop Benedikt Vinković

See also

 List of Glagolitic books

References

Sources 

 
 
 
 

1597 births
1649 deaths
Members of the Congregation for the Propagation of the Faith
Latin–Croatian translators
17th-century Roman Catholic archbishops in Croatia
Bishops appointed by Pope Innocent X
Archbishops of Ohrid
Croatian Roman Catholic archbishops